Wyanett is an unincorporated community in Wyanett Township, Isanti County, Minnesota, United States.

The community is located between Cambridge and Princeton at the junction of State Highway 95 (MN 95) and Nacre Street NW.

References

 Official State of Minnesota Highway Map – 2013/2014 edition

Unincorporated communities in Minnesota
Unincorporated communities in Isanti County, Minnesota